Ludwig Adolph Timotheus Radlkofer (19 December 1829, in Munich – 16 February 1927, in Munich), was a Bavarian taxonomist and botanist. 

Radlkofer became a physician in 1854 and earned a PhD in botany at Jena the following year. He became an associate professor of botany at the University of Munich in 1859 as well as deputy director of the botanical garden and herbarium. In 1892 he was named director of the Botanical Museum. He was made emeritus professor in 1913 and died in 1927 in the same room in which he was born.

Radlkofer's main work was on the family Sapindaceae. His collections, sent by botanists from all over the world, are housed in Munich.

The South African flower Greyia radlkoferi is named for him, as are the South American based genera of Radlkoferotoma, and Radlkofera, a monotypic genus of flowering plants from Africa belonging to the family Sapindaceae.

The former genus Radlkoferella (a wastebasket genus) is now called Pouteria,.

Published works 
Among his numerous written works are treatises published in English, such as:
 "Three new species of Sapindaceae from western Mexico and Lower California", (1895).
 "New and noteworthy Hawaiian plants", (1911).
 "New Sapindaceae from Panama and Costa Rica", (1914).
His other principal works include:
 Die Befruchtung der Phanerogamen. Ein Beitrag zur Entscheidung des darüber bestehenden Streites, (1856).
 Der Befruchtungsprocess im Pflanzenreiche und sein Verhältniss zu dem im Thierreiche, (1857).
 Ergänzungen zur Monographie der Sapindaceen-Gattung Serjania, (1875).
 Ueber die Sapindaceen Holländisch-Indiens, (1877).
 Sapindaceae (issued in eight parts 1931-1934); In: Engler's Das Pflanzenreich.

References

Botanists at Munich University

External links 
 IPNI List of Plants described and co-described by Radlkofer.

19th-century German botanists
German taxonomists
1829 births
1927 deaths
Scientists from Munich
Academic staff of the Ludwig Maximilian University of Munich